Sergiu Victor Homei (born 6 July 1987) is a Romanian former football player. He played as a right back. Homei was a member of Romania's national under-21 football team.

Career
Homei started professional football at the age of 17, playing for CF Liberty Salonta in Liga II, winning a place in the first eleven in the second part of the year. Liberty won Liga II that year, but UT Arad bought their place, and so they would play in the third division, Liga III. Homei subsequently transferred to MFC Sopron in the Bordosi Liga, where he played 14 matches in the first half of the season before moving to Dinamo București in Liga I. He played his first match in the top football league of Romania against FC Argeş Piteşti. In order to play more matches, Homei was loaned for one year to Politehnica Iaşi in the pre-season period of 2007. He returned to Dinamo in the summer of 2008, when his loan expired, and manifested his wish to be loaned again at Politehnica Iaşi. He was later loaned to Gloria Bistriţa, Unirea Urziceni and FCM Târgu Mureş. Homei never managed to make the step towards the first team at Dinamo and in 2013 he was released.

In January 2014, Homei signed a contract for 18 months with Corona Brașov. After the team was relegated from Liga I at the end of the 2013–14 season, Homei became a free agent and signed a contract for two years with FC Botoșani. Homei joined Bulgarian club Neftochimic Burgas in the summer of 2016.

In August 2017, Homei signed with Pandurii Târgu Jiu.

Honours
Liberty Salonta
Liga II: 2005–06
Dinamo București
Liga I: 2006–07

References

External links
 
 
 

1987 births
Living people
People from Năsăud
Romanian footballers
Romania under-21 international footballers
Association football defenders
Romanian expatriate footballers
Expatriate footballers in Bulgaria
Expatriate footballers in Hungary
Liga I players
FC Dinamo București players
FC Politehnica Iași (1945) players
ACF Gloria Bistrița players
FC Unirea Urziceni players
ASA 2013 Târgu Mureș players
Liga II players
CF Liberty Oradea players
LPS HD Clinceni players
CS Pandurii Târgu Jiu players
CSM Corona Brașov footballers
FC Botoșani players
Nemzeti Bajnokság I players
FC Sopron players
First Professional Football League (Bulgaria) players
Neftochimic Burgas players
Romanian expatriate sportspeople in Bulgaria
Romanian expatriate sportspeople in Hungary